CEMAT (Italian acronym for Centri musicali attrezzati—lit. "Equipped musical centers; thus, the Federation of Italian Electroacoustic Music Centers). 

CEMAT was founded in 1996 with the purpose of promoting the activity of Italian computer music research and production centers. In the self-description in its published literature:  "...Its function is to serve as a useful rallying point for independent centers in the field of computer music research, creation and education." 

In 1999, the Ministry of Cultural Heritage and Activities and Tourism recognized CEMAT as an Institution for National Contemporary Music Promotion.

References

External links
http://federazionecemat.it/

Italian music